The 2018 K3 League Advanced was the twelfth season of amateur K3 League.

Teams

Regular season

League table

Results

Championship playoffs
When the first round and semi-final matches were finished as draws, their winners were decided on the regular season rankings without extra time and the penalty shoot-out.

Bracket

See also
 2018 in South Korean football
 2018 Korean FA Cup

References

External links
RSSSF

2018 in South Korean football